Cossus hoenei is a moth in the family Cossidae. It is found in China (Shaanxi).

The length of the forewings is about 22 mm. The forewings are grey-brown with a wavy pattern and a small light-grey field in the discal area.

Etymology
The species is named in honour of Dr H. Höne.

References

Natural History Museum Lepidoptera generic names catalog

Cossus
Moths of Asia
Moths described in 2006